Michalis Konstantinou (born 19 February 1978) is a Cypriot former professional footballer who played as a striker. He played for the Cyprus national football team, and he is the all-time leading scorer with 32 goals in 85 appearances. 
He also played for Iraklis, Panathinaikos and Olympiacos in Greece.

Club career

Early

Born in Paralimni, he got his start in professional football playing for hometown side Enosis Neon Paralimni, for whom he scored 17 goals in 25 games in the 1996/97 season and became top goal scorer of Cypriot Championship.

Iraklis Thessaloniki

Picked up by Iraklis Thessaloniki in Greece in 1997, his four seasons produced a total of 61 goals in 119 appearances as he also played in the UEFA Cup.

Panathinaikos

In 2001, in a deal which took three Panathinaikos players to Iraklis, Konstantinou transferred to Panathinaikos for €15 million. It was a successful purchase, but many believed that the young Cypriot striker was worth less than the expenditure of €15 million made by Panathinaikos – the highest figure ever paid for a player in the Greek Superleague. With Panathinaikos, he had the opportunity to play in the Champions League, earning praise for his performances in attack. There he found with the Portuguese players Paulo Sousa and later Robert Jarni, taking Panathinakos a long way in the competition. He scored a beautiful 45m goal in the Nou Camp return in the quarter-final against Barcelona in the Champions 2001/02. Panathinaikos seemed to ensure its marking the semi-finals, as they were needed 3 goals to go to the Spaniards. Barça, however, came back and won 3–1, qualifying for the semi-finals.

In 2004/05 he had 15 goals. Konstantinou scored against the champions in a 1–0 home win, at the end of the season Konstantinou did not renew with Panathinaikos, because he stated that he was going to continue his footballing career in a league of higher value to gain better experience.

That summer though, he was not signed by a club overseas and was signed by Olympiacos.

Olympiakos

As an Olympiacos player he won with his team the double for 2005/06 and made it two in his career. At the Greek Cup final in 2005/06, where Olympiacos beat AEK Athens 3–0, Konstantinou scored Olympiacos' first goal. He also notably scored a late strike to make it 1–2 in the early season league victory of Olympiacos against AEK Athens (final score 1–3) and a crowd-pleaser against his former team, Panathinaikos, to make it 3–1 (match ended 3–2). He became for the second consecutive time champion again with Olympiakos in 2007, even though the season was full of personal injuries and bad luck, he still managed to perform well on some important matches, most notably scoring on the away Champions League match at Shakhtar Donetsk. During the 2007–2008 season, he has suffered from injuries and has lost his starting position to Darko Kovacevic. It was the last season at Olympiakos.

Iraklis Thessaloniki

Konstantinou started the 2008–09 season in Greece at Iraklis where he started his career in Greece in 1997. He spent some seasons at Iraklis before going to Panathinaikos back in 1997. Here he played 13 matches of which he scored three goals.

Omonoia Nicosia

Halfway through the 2008–2009 season, Konstantinou was transferred to Cyprus to play for Omonia. During the 2009–2010 season, he scored several goals for the club, including in derbies against rivals APOEL, Anorthosis, and Apollon. After taking a leadership and mentor role with the team in his first full season in 2010, Konstantinou helped Omonoia to win its 20th Cypriot Championship and in the club he found his couch Takis Lemonis that was also his coach in Olympiacos.

Anorthosis Famagusta

In Summer 2011, Konstantinou signed a contract with Anorthosis Famagusta.

AEL Limasssol
In Summer 2012, Konstantinou signed a one-year contract with AEL Limassol.

Retirement
In January 2014, he announced his retirement from football as a player.

International career
He made his international debut against Albania in August 1998 and subsequently averaged almost a goal every other game in his first 35 caps. His first two goals came 10 February 1999 against San Marino at Tsirion Stadium (final score 4–0).

International goals

|}

Honours

Club
Panathinaikos
Super League Greece: 2003–04
Greek Cup: 2003–04

Olympiacos
Super League Greece: 2005–06, 2006–07, 2007–08
Greek Cup: 2005–06, 2007–08
Greek Super Cup: 2007

Omonia
Cypriot First Division: 2009–10
Cypriot Cup: 2010–11
Cypriot Super Cup: 2010

Individual
Cypriot First Division Top scorer: 1996–97
Greek Cup MVP: 2003–04, 2005–06

See also
 List of top international men's football goalscorers by country

References

External links
 UEFA.com biography
 
 Michalis Konstandinou – Goals in International Matches

1978 births
Living people
Cypriot footballers
Association football forwards
Cyprus international footballers
Greek Cypriot people
Enosis Neon Paralimni FC players
Iraklis Thessaloniki F.C. players
Panathinaikos F.C. players
Olympiacos F.C. players
AC Omonia players
Anorthosis Famagusta F.C. players
AEL Limassol players
Super League Greece players
Cypriot First Division players
Cypriot expatriate footballers
People from Famagusta District